Diving Diseases Research Centre (DDRC Healthcare) is a British hyperbaric medical organisation on Plymouth Science Park adjacent to Derriford Hospital in Plymouth, Devon. It is a UK registered charity (no.279652) and was established in 1980 at Fort Bovisand (then called Diving Diseases Research Centre) to research the effects of underwater diving on human physiology. The Centre moved to its site on Plymouth Science Park in 1996 and  provides training, treatment and research facilities and houses a Krug multi-place chamber, two Comex chambers (which were in use at Fort Bovisand) and a monoplace chamber.

DDRC Healthcare has published more than 25 articles on hyperbaric treatments in a variety of journals. They work to increase the availability of high quality, cost effective, hyperbaric oxygen (HBO) therapy, through the provision of medical treatment and advice; education and training; and research. Patients at DDRC Healthcare include both routine and emergency cases.

DDRC Healthcare has two not-for-profit subsidiaries, DDRC Professional Services Ltd and DDRC Medical Services Ltd, both of which help support DDRC Healthcare. DDRC Wound Care provides specialised wound care services to privately funded patients, and engages in wound care related research.

References

External links
 DDRC Healthcare

Diving medicine organizations
Diving organizations
Health in Devon
Medical research institutes in the United Kingdom
Plymouth, Devon
Science and technology in Devon
Underwater diving in the United Kingdom